The 1994 Bucknell Bison football team was an American football team that represented Bucknell University during the 1994 NCAA Division I-AA football season. Bucknell tied for second-to-last in the Patriot League. 

In their sixth and final year under head coach Lou Maranzana, the Bison compiled a 5–6 record. Ed Frattarelli, Russ Strohecker and Andrew Welty were the team captains.

The Bison were outscored 311 to 272. Their 2–3 conference record tied for fourth (and second-worst) in the six-team Patriot League standings. 

Bucknell played its home games at Christy Mathewson–Memorial Stadium on the university campus in Lewisburg, Pennsylvania.

Schedule

References

Bucknell
Bucknell Bison football seasons
Bucknell Bison football